The 2013–14 Football League One (referred to as Sky Bet League One for sponsorship reasons) is the tenth season of the league under its current title and twenty-first season under its current league division format. The season began on 2 August 2013 and finished on 3 May 2014 with all matches that day kicking off simultaneously.

Of the 24 teams which participate, seventeen of these remain following the 2012–13 Football League One. They are joined by three teams from 2012–13 Football League Championship, and four teams from the 2012–13 Football League Two. Wolverhampton Wanderers achieved the highest point tally ever in the history of League One with 103 points.

Changes from last season

Team changes
The following teams have changed division since the 2012–13 season.

To League One
Promoted from League Two
 Gillingham
 Rotherham United
 Port Vale
 Bradford City

Relegated from Championship
 Bristol City
 Wolverhampton Wanderers
 Peterborough United

From League One
Relegated to League Two
 Bury
 Hartlepool United
 Portsmouth
 Scunthorpe United

Promoted to Championship
 Doncaster Rovers
 Bournemouth
 Yeovil Town

League table

Play-offs

Team overview

Stadia and locations

 1 From 5 September 2014, Coventry played their home games at the Ricoh Arena in Coventry

Personnel and sponsoring 

Note: Flags indicate national team as has been defined under FIFA eligibility rules. Players may hold more than one non-FIFA nationality.

Managerial changes

Results

Season statistics

Top scorers

Scoring
First goal: Kevin McDonald for Sheffield United against Notts County (2 August 2013)
Fastest goal: 12 seconds 
Kieran Agard for Rotherham United against Gillingham  (''3 April 2014 )
Largest winning margin: 6 goals
Rotherham United 6–0 Notts County (1 March 2014)
Highest scoring game: 10 goals
Wolverhampton Wanderers 6–4 Rotherham United (18 April 2014)
Most goals scored in a match by a single team: 6 goals
Rotherham United 6–0 Notts County (1 March 2014)
Preston North End 6–1 Carlisle United (12 April 2014)
Wolverhampton Wanderers 6–4 Rotherham United (18 April 2014)
Most goals scored in a match by a losing team: 4 goals
Coventry 5–4 Bristol City (12 August 2013)
Oldham 5–4 Peterborough United (25 January 2014)
Wolverhampton Wanderers 6–4 Rotherham United (18 April 2014)

References

External links 
 

 
EFL League One seasons
2013–14 Football League
3
Eng